Mogo Creek is a locality within the City of Hawkesbury, in outer metropolitan Sydney, in the state of New South Wales, Australia. It is located south-west of the town of Bucketty. Mangrove Creek Dam is within the locality, and the western half of the locality is within Yengo National Park. Mogo Creek runs adjacent to the locality.

References

Suburbs of Sydney
City of Hawkesbury